Lotfi Joudi (born 11 August 1963) is a Tunisian table tennis player. He competed in the men's singles event at the 1988 Summer Olympics.

References

1963 births
Living people
Tunisian male table tennis players
Olympic table tennis players of Tunisia
Table tennis players at the 1988 Summer Olympics
Place of birth missing (living people)
20th-century Tunisian people